Sellin is a municipality in Mecklenburg-Vorpommern, Germany.

Sellin may also refer to:

People
 David Sellin (1930–2006), American historian
 Debbie Sellin (born 1964), British Anglican bishop
 Ernst Sellin (1867–1946), German theologian
 Gustaf Adolf Sellin, Swedish skier
 Jarosław Sellin (born 1963), Polish politician
 Johannes Sellin (born 1990), German handball player
 Kjell Rune Sellin (born 1989), Norwegian footballer
 Robbin Sellin (born 1990), Swedish footballer
 Thorsten Sellin (1896–1994), American sociologist

Other uses
 5789 Sellin, main-belt asteroid

See also
 Fannie Sellins (1872–1919), American union organizer
 Selin (disambiguation)
 Sillen